Saetgang Station is a railway station on Line 9 and Sillim Line of the Seoul Subway.

Station layout

Railway stations opened in 2009
Seoul Metropolitan Subway stations
Yeouido
Metro stations in Yeongdeungpo District
2009 establishments in South Korea